Reda Milad Al Tawarghi (born May 29, 1979 in Libya) is a Libyan football defender. He currently plays for Al Tersana and is a member of the Libya national football team.

He was a close friend of Saadi Gaddafi, a teammate at Al Ahly Tripoli from 2001 to 2003 and the son of then Libyan leader Muammar Gaddafi. After the Battle of Tripoli in August 2011, Tawarghi alleged he was thrown in jail for two and a half years for rejecting Saadi's homosexual advances.

References

External links 
 

1979 births
Living people
Libyan footballers
Association football defenders
Al-Ahli SC (Tripoli) players
Olympic Azzaweya SC players
Libya international footballers
Libyan Premier League players